Florence Marly (2 June 1919 – 9 November 1978) was a Czech-born French film actress. During World War II, Marly moved to neutral Argentina with her Jewish husband, film director Pierre Chenal, where she appeared in several films. She also acted in two of her husband's films while they were in Chile.

Career
Marly was born Hana Smékalová in Obrnice, Czechoslovakia. She studied French and her dream was to become an opera singer. At age 18 she went to Paris to study art, literature, and philosophy at Sorbonne. She met her future husband Pierre Chenal who cast her in his film The Alibi. She played a major role in René Clément's Les Maudits, a fictionalized account showing the fate of Nazi refugees. After moving to Hollywood, she acted in Paramount's film Sealed Verdict opposite Ray Milland. Next year, she starred in Stuart Heisler's Tokyo Joe (1949) alongside Humphrey Bogart. In it she played Bogart's wife, who divorces him after he moves to the United States from Japan before Peal Harbor brought the United States into World War II. The film met with mixed responses from critics. Clive Hirschhorn wrote in his book, The Columbia Story, that it was "a little more than a Bogart parody". Marly's acting in the espionage film Tokyo File 212 brought her appreciations. Robert J. Lentz wrote in Korean War Filmography that she had given the best performance in the film. It was Hollywood's first feature film to be shot entirely in Japan.

In 1962 she appeared in a small role as a gangster's girlfriend in the Twilight Zone episode Dead Man's Shoes. She had the eponymous role of a blood-thirsty vampire queen in Curtis Harrington-directed science fiction horror film Queen of Blood (1966), based on a novel by Charles Nuetzel. It met with positive reviews. Paul Meehan wrote in Saucer Movies that she gave a "convincing" performance. Marly made a 16 mm sequel to Queen of Blood titled Space Boy! (1973).

Personal life
At a dinner, director Fritz Lang bit Marly's hand. During the early years of her acting career, the U.S. Consulate mistook her for the Russian-born, left-inclined, singer and songwriter Anna Marly, and she was subsequently blacklisted in Hollywood by the House Un-American Activities Committee. Even after she was cleared from the blacklist, at a Hollywood party Jack L. Warner "turned his back on [her]". Noël Coward, in a letter, called her a "rather sweet" "beautiful Czech lady". She was married to Chenal from 1937 to 1955. In 1956 she married the Austrian Count Degenhart von Wurmbrand-Stuppach (1893-1965) but divorced him the same year.

Filmography

 The Alibi (1937) - La maitresse de Gordon
 The Lafarge Case (1938) - Emma Pontier
 Café de Paris (1938) - Estelle
 Sirocco (1938) - Diana
 Savage Brigade (1939) - Isa Ostrowski
 Le Dernier Tournant (1939) - Madge, la dompteuse
 La piel de Zapa (1943) - Fedora
 End of the Night (1944)
 Viaje sin regreso (1946)
 The Damned (1947) - Hilde Garosi
 Krakatit (1948) - Princess Wilhelmina Hagen
 Sealed Verdict (1948) - Themis DeLisle
 Tokyo Joe (1949) - Trina Pechinkov Landis
 Tokyo File 212 (1951) - Steffi Novak
 Gobs and Gals (1952) - Soyna DuBois
 El ídolo (1952) - Cristina Arnaud
 Confession at Dawn (1954)
 Undersea Girl (1957) - Leila Graham - Gang Moll
 Queen of Blood (1966) - Alien Queen
 Games (1967) - Baroness, Party Guest
 Doctor Death: Seeker of Souls (1973) - Tana
 Space Boy (1973, Short)
 The Astrologer (1975) - Diana Blair (final film role)

References

External links

 

1919 births
1978 deaths
French film actresses
Czech film actresses
20th-century French actresses
People from Most District
Czechoslovak emigrants to France
French expatriates in Argentina
French expatriates in Chile
French expatriates in the United States